Psecadioides is a genus of moths belonging to the family Tineidae.

Species
Psecadioides aspersus Butler, 1881 (=Luffiodes apicalis Matsumura, 1931)
Psecadioides cuneus G.H. Huang, Hirowatari & M. Wang, 2010
Psecadioides owadai G.H. Huang, Hirowatari & M. Wang, 2010
Psecadioides prominens G.H. Huang, Hirowatari & M. Wang, 2010
Psecadioides tanylopha (Meyrick, 1932)

References

Euplocaminae